Don't Let Go is an American independent feature film released in 2002, written and directed by Max Myers. It won an Outstanding Directorial Achievement award at the Stony Brook Film Festival in New York, the Best Picture Award at the Westchester Film Festival (NY)  and a Prism Award  in Los Angeles.

Story
Jimmy Ray (played by Scott Wilson) is a Rockabilly star who is legendary both because of his great songs and because of his premature musical retirement, due to the death of his brother. Years later his own sons have their own band. Jimmy Ray who is a heavy drinker and still grieving decades later is furious with his sons for wanting to choose the path of music. His wife, (played by Oscar-winner Katharine Ross), tries to keep the peace.

References

External links

2002 films
American independent films
Films about dysfunctional families
2000s road movies
American road movies
2002 directorial debut films
2002 independent films
2000s English-language films
2000s American films